Monardella candicans is a species of flowering plant in the mint family known by the common name Sierra monardella.

Distribution
It is endemic to the Sierra Nevada foothills of California, where it grows in several types of local habitat, including chaparral, woodland, and forests.

Description
Monardella candicans is an annual herb producing a purple stem with lance-shaped green leaves arranged oppositely. The inflorescence is a head of several flowers blooming in a cup of green, veined bracts. Each five-lobed flower is white, sometimes with purple speckles, and roughly a centimeter long.

External links
  Calflora Database: Monardella candicans (Sierra monardella)
 Jepson Manual eFlora (TJM2) treatment of Monardella candicans
 USDA Plants Profile for Monardella candicans
 UC CalPhotos gallery of Monardella candicans (Sierra monardella)

candicans
Endemic flora of California
Flora of the Sierra Nevada (United States)
Natural history of the Central Valley (California)
Taxa named by George Bentham
Flora without expected TNC conservation status